In Greek mythology, Tyro was an Elean princess who later became Queen of Iolcus.

Family 
Tyro was the daughter of King Salmoneus of Elis and Alcidice, daughter of King Aleus of Arcadia. She married her uncle King Cretheus of Iolcus but loved the river-god Enipeus. Tyro gave birth to Pelias and Neleus, the twin sons of Poseidon. With Cretheus, she had three sons, Aeson, Pheres and Amythaon. In some accounts, Tyro had a daughter named Phalanna who gave her name to city of Phalanna in Thessaly.

Mythology 
Tyro's father Salmoneus was the brother of Athamas and Sisyphus. She was married to her uncle Cretheus, King of Iolcus but Tyro loved the river god Enipeus who refused her advances. One day, Poseidon filled with lust for Tyro, disguised himself as Enipeus and from their union was born Pelias and Neleus, twin boys. Tyro exposed her sons on a mountain to die, but they were found by a herdsman who raised them as his own. When the twins reached adulthood, they found Tyro and killed her stepmother, Sidero, for having mistreated their mother (Salmoneus married Sidero when Alcidice died). Sidero hid at the temple of Hera but Pelias killed her anyway, causing Hera's undying hatred of Pelias – and her glorious patronage of Jason and the Argonauts in their long quest for the Golden Fleece. Pelias' half brother Aeson, the son of Tyro and Cretheus, was the father of Jason. Soon after, Tyro married Sisyphus, her paternal uncle and had two children. It was said that their children would kill Salmoneus, so Tyro killed them in order to save her father.

In popular culture
Ezra Pound refers to Tyro in The Cantos. In Canto 2 he takes up her rape by Poseidon:"And by the beach-run, Tyro,Twisted arms of the sea-god,Lithe sinews of water, gripping her, cross-hold,And the blue-gray glass of the wave tents them,Glare azure of water, cold-welter, close cover."In a later Canto (74) Pound connects her to Alcmene, imprisoned in the world of the dead, but in a later paradisal vision he sees her "ascending":thick smoke, purple, risingbright flame now on the altarthe crystal funnel of airout of Erebus, the delivered,Tyro, Alcmene, free now, ascending[...] no shades more (Canto 90)

Notes

References 

 Diodorus Siculus, The Library of History translated by Charles Henry Oldfather. Twelve volumes. Loeb Classical Library. Cambridge, Massachusetts: Harvard University Press; London: William Heinemann, Ltd. 1989. Vol. 3. Books 4.59–8. Online version at Bill Thayer's Web Site
 Diodorus Siculus, Bibliotheca Historica. Vol 1-2. Immanel Bekker. Ludwig Dindorf. Friedrich Vogel. in aedibus B. G. Teubneri. Leipzig. 1888–1890. Greek text available at the Perseus Digital Library.
 Gaius Julius Hyginus, Fabulae from The Myths of Hyginus translated and edited by Mary Grant. University of Kansas Publications in Humanistic Studies. Online version at the Topos Text Project.
 Hesiod, Catalogue of Women from Homeric Hymns, Epic Cycle, Homerica translated by Evelyn-White, H G. Loeb Classical Library Volume 57. London: William Heinemann, 1914. Online version at theio.com
 Homer, The Odyssey with an English Translation by A.T. Murray, Ph.D. in two volumes. Cambridge, MA., Harvard University Press; London, William Heinemann, Ltd. 1919. Online version at the Perseus Digital Library. Greek text available from the same website.
 Pseudo-Apollodorus, The Library with an English Translation by Sir James George Frazer, F.B.A., F.R.S. in 2 Volumes, Cambridge, MA, Harvard University Press; London, William Heinemann Ltd. 1921. Online version at the Perseus Digital Library. Greek text available from the same website.
 Stephanus of Byzantium, Stephani Byzantii Ethnicorum quae supersunt, edited by August Meineike (1790-1870), published 1849. A few entries from this important ancient handbook of place names have been translated by Brady Kiesling. Online version at the Topos Text Project.

Princesses in Greek mythology
Queens in Greek mythology
Family of Salmoneus
Mortal parents of demigods in classical mythology
Women of Poseidon
Characters from Iolcus
Elean characters in Greek mythology
Thessalian characters in Greek mythology
Elean mythology
Thessalian mythology